Karosa LC 956 is a long-distance coach produced by bus manufacturer Karosa from the Czech Republic, in the years 2002 to 2006. In 2003 was introduced modernised version LC 956 E.

Construction features 
Karosa LC 956 is model of Karosa 900 series. LC 956 is unified with city bus models such as B 952 and B 961. Body was assembled to the skeleton, which has undergone a dip stage, sheets were galvanized and painted and then to have it installed additional components. Body is semi-self-supporting with frame and engine with manual gearbox is placed in the rear part. Only rear axle is propulsed. Front and rear axles are solid. All axles are mounted on air suspension. On the right side are two doors. Inside are used cloth seats. Drivers cab is not separated from the rest of the vehicle.

Production and operation 
In 2002 started serial production, which continued until 2006. Since 2003 were buses produced only modernised version LC 956 E.

Historical vehicles 
Any historical vehicle was not saved yet.

See also 

 List of buses

Buses manufactured by Karosa
Buses of the Czech Republic